Probolaeus is a genus of long-beaked fungus gnats in the family Lygistorrhinidae.

Species
P. alexi (Huerta & Ibañez-Bernal, 2008)
P. barrettoi (Lane, 1946)
P. borkenti (Huerta & Ibañez-Bernal, 2008)
P. brasiliensis (Edwards, 1932)
P. cerquerai (Lane, 1958)
P. edwardsi (Lane, 1946)
P. singularis Williston, 1896
P. urichi (Edwards, 1912)

References

Sciaroidea genera
Taxa named by Samuel Wendell Williston